Hammer and Anvil are supervillains appearing in American comic books published by Marvel Comics.

Publication history
They first appeared in Hulk #182 (December 1974), and were created by Len Wein and Herb Trimpe.

Fictional character biographies
Leroy "Hammer" Jackson was an African-American prisoner said to hate everyone and everything. As part of a chain gang, he was chained to a white racist named Johnny Anvil. The pair's hatred of prison, however, was stronger than their hate for each other and they succeeded in escaping the chain gang while still chained together. Hammer stole a .38 handgun from a guard. When the two encountered an alien who had crashed on Earth, Hammer tried to kill it but inadvertently saved the creature's life instead; it fed on metal, and used the bullets fired at it to regenerate. The alien wanted to thank them, and replaced the chain linking them with a device that granted them superhuman powers. The two returned to prison seeking revenge, but wound up battling the Hulk instead.

Hammer and Anvil were hired as field operatives by the Deterrence Research Corporation. They encountered and battled Spider-Man and the Guardians of the Galaxy. They also encountered the Freaks. Hammer and Anvil kidnapped Amanda Sheridan for the DRC, and fought Spider-Woman.

Lured into the Nevada desert to fight the Hulk, Hammer was shot through the head with an explosive bullet by the Scourge of the Underworld, disguised as a Native American shaman. Linked by the Synthecon to his dead ally, Anvil died soon afterward.

Powers and equipment
An alien Glx named Chleee was responsible for transforming a chain into an "energy synthecon" which linked the criminals Hammer and Anvil together symbiotically at the wrist and gave them superhuman powers. The synthecon provided the ability to absorb physical damage without harm, using the kinetic energy to increase their strength to superhuman levels. Anyone touching Hammer and Anvil while they are powered took damage from the energy.

Other versions

Ultimate Marvel
In Ultimate Fantastic Four #49 (February 2008), a squad of Russian armored villains attack the Fantastic Four. Two of these identify themselves as Hammer and Anvil. Each seems to have only one arm, with bolts of energy linking them on their limbless sides like a diode. Their method of attack is to get their opponent between them to catch them in the destructive energy stream.

References

External links
 Hammer and Anvil at the Marvel Wiki

Characters created by Herb Trimpe
Characters created by Len Wein
Comics characters introduced in 1974
Fictional African-American people
Marvel Comics supervillain teams
Marvel Comics supervillains